Khanapur (Vita) is a village and taluka and a subdivision of Sangli district of Maharashtra in India.

References

Cities and towns in Sangli district
Talukas in Maharashtra